John Savident (born 21 January 1938) is a British actor, known for his numerous television roles, including his portrayal of Fred Elliott in the soap opera Coronation Street from 1994 to 2006. He is also known for his performance as Monsieur Firmin in the West End debut of The Phantom of the Opera and The Lion King.

Early life
Savident was born in Guernsey and still lived there at the time of the German occupation of the island in 1940. He and his family escaped to England in a fishing boat. During his early years, he was a police officer before turning to acting as his profession.

Career
Savident created the role of Monsieur Firmin in the original production of Phantom of the Opera, which opened on 9 October 1986 at Her Majesty's Theatre in Haymarket, London. He appeared as the renegade scientist Egrorian in a 1981 episode of the cult science fiction TV series Blake's 7. He also had other television appearances in The Saint, Callan and Doctor Who .

Coronation Street
Despite his many film and TV roles (including civil servant Sir Frederick Stewart in Yes, Minister and a memorable part in A Clockwork Orange), it was only during the 1990s when Savident joined the cast of Coronation Street as the bellicose but romantic butcher Fred Elliott that he became a household name. He made his first appearance on the show in 1994 and his character quickly became popular with viewers.

In December 2005, Savident announced that he was to leave Coronation Street citing (undisclosed) "personal reasons". His character died of a stroke nine months later, in October 2006. He later revealed that he had retired from the show "because he wanted to spend more time with his family in Hertfordshire".

Since leaving, he has been critical of the way the series is produced in a number of articles and television interviews, claiming that the programme is amongst other things "on too frequently" and "badly lit". He has also said he disagrees with the programme hiring well-known actors, as it takes jobs away from struggling, unknown actors.

Later work
Savident was one of the readers on the BBC's online Advent Calendar in December 2006. That year, he appeared in the pantomime Snow White and the Seven Dwarfs as the henchman at Manchester Opera House, alongside his former Coronation Street co-star Suranne Jones, as well as Justin Moorhouse and an all-star seven dwarves including Warwick Davis.

In 2007, he was touring as the lead in a production of Hobson's Choice. He appeared on Loose Women on 19 March 2009 to discuss his part as Sir Joseph Porter in the Gilbert and Sullivan operetta HMS Pinafore, which toured the United Kingdom during the spring and summer of 2009.

He guest-starred in the Christmas special episode of Holby City in 2012, playing patient Rupert Pool. He voiced the character Pendle in the Doctor Who audio-drama Order of the Daleks.

Personal life
On 1 December 2000, Savident was stabbed in the neck at his home in Manchester by Michael Smith, who claimed he was acting in self-defence. Savident said at the time, "I suddenly felt somebody come up behind me and whizz me round so I was face down on the bed and then I felt a prick on my throat". Smith demanded valuables from Savident, and the keys to his classic Morgan sports car. Savident had met Smith in Napoleon's, a gay bar, following a personal appearance at an event for World AIDS Day. They then went to Savident's home – apparently to discuss the theatre – which Smith claimed was a euphemism for sex. In September 2002, Smith, by then aged 30, was sentenced to seven years in prison. He had been charged with wounding Savident with intent to cause him grievous bodily harm and robbing him of his wallet, credit cards, a silver money clip and cash, a Georg Jensen watch and ring, keys, and an invitation to Coronation Street'''s 40th anniversary birthday party. Savident's neck was pierced twice in a struggle with Smith; one of the wounds only missed the main artery in Savident's neck by less than an inch, and sliced straight through a minor blood vessel. The next week on Coronation Street, the large sticking plaster on his character's neck was explained as a "butchering accident". 

Savident has been married to Rona Hopkinson since 1961; the couple have two children and several grandchildren.

FilmographyRobbery (1967) – Policeman with Dog (uncredited)The White Bus (1967) – SupporterThe Avengers (1968) - Henry WinthropInadmissible Evidence (1968) – Mr. WatsonOtley (1969) – BusinessmanBefore Winter Comes (1969) – British CorporalBattle of Britain (1969) – RAF Officer (uncredited)Waterloo (1970) – MufflingA Family at War (1970-1972, TV Series) – George Askew
 Man of Straw (1972, TV series) – Von WulchowThe Raging Moon (1971) – Fete GuestA Clockwork Orange (1971) – Conspirator DolinPenny Gold (1973) – Sir Robert HamptonHitler: The Last Ten Days (1973) – HewelDiamonds on Wheels (1974) – Steward Butley (1974) – James (uncredited)QB VII (1974) – AnaesthetistGalileo (1974) – Second SenatorLooking For Clancy (1975) – Sir John KernanTrial by Combat (1976) – Oliver Griggs – Police CommissionerRaffles (1976) (TV series) Series 1, Episode 10 Mr. Justice Raffles - Daniel Brigstock
Rachel and the Beelzebub Bombardiers (1977) – Captain Verney, MP
1990 (1977) – Dan Mellor
The Professionals (1978) - Robert Plumb (Servant of Two Masters episode)
Blake's 7 (1979) – Samor
Yes Minister (1980)
Blake's 7 (1981) – Egrorian
Doctor Who: The Visitation (1982) – The Squire (1 episode) 
Gandhi (1982) – Manager of the Mine
Oliver Twist (1982, TV Movie) – Mr. Fang
The Wicked Lady (1983) – Squire Thornton
The Bill (1984, TV Series) – Video shop owner
Little Dorrit (1987) – Tite Barnacle
A Summer Story (1988) – A Banc Clerk
Camping (1990) – English camper
Mountains of the Moon (1990) – Lord Murchison8
Impromptu (1991) – Buloz
Hudson Hawk (1991) – Auctioneer
Mr.Bean Takes an Exam (1991) - examination invigilator
Jeeves and Wooster (1992) (TV Series) Series 3, Episode 2 Edgar Gascoyne Bickersteth, 8th Duke of Chiswick
Brain Donors (1992) – Edmund Lazlo
 Mrs 'Arris Goes to Paris (1992) - Mr Armont 
The Remains of the Day (1993) – Doctor Meredith
Tom & Viv (1994) – Sir Frederick Lamb
Coronation Street (1994–2006) – Fred Elliott (1,063 episodes)
Middlemarch (1994) – Raffles
Othello (1995) – 2nd Senator
Loch Ness (1996) – Dr. Binns
Sharpe - Sharpe's Regiment (1996) - Maj. Gen. Sir Barstan Maxwell
The Phantom of the Opera at the Royal Albert Hall (2011) – Monsieur Firmin
The Life and Times of Mim Stewart (2019) – Gary Brennan

Notes

External links

1938 births
British police officers
Living people
People educated at Ashton-under-Lyne Grammar School
Guernsey male actors
British male actors
British male film actors
British male soap opera actors